Admiral George Augustus Giffard, CMG (20 February 1849 – 23 September 1925) was a Royal Navy officer.

The son of Captain Henry Wells Giffard and the grandson of Admiral John Giffard and of Major-General Sir Benjamin Stephenson, Giffard entered HMS Britannia as a cadet in 1862. Promoted to lieutenant in 1870, he then joined HMS Niobe in North American waters. He volunteered for duty and took part in the British Arctic Expedition of 1875–1876, for which he was awarded the Arctic Medal. He was first lieutenant of the screw sloop HMS Pelican from 1877 to 1882, when he joined HMS Penelope, the flagship of Rear-Admiral Anthony Hoskins during the Anglo-Egyptian War. For his Egyptian service, he received the Egypt Medal and the Khedive's Star.

References 

Royal Navy personnel of the Anglo-Egyptian War
1925 deaths
Royal Navy admirals
Companions of the Order of St Michael and St George
English justices of the peace